Baryn is a village in Osh Region of Kyrgyzstan. It is part of the Nookat District. Its population was 10,619 in 2021.

Population

References

Populated places in Osh Region